The North Alabama Lions football program represents the University of North Alabama (UNA) in college football as the NCAA Division I Football Championship Subdivision (FCS) level as a member of the ASUN Conference. UNA plays its home games at Braly Municipal Stadium in Florence, Alabama. The team's head coach is Brent Dearmon. UNA was an NCAA Division II from member from 1972 to 2017.

The Lions are distinguished as the only team to win three consecutive football national championships in NCAA Division II. UNA's 27 consecutive weeks at No. 1 in the Division II polls also comprise the longest stretch of consecutive No. 1 rankings in football in NCAA history on any level. UNA was the last Division II team to beat a Division I-A (FBS) team, defeating Southwestern Louisiana (now Louisiana) on October 11, 1997. In 2016, UNA won their fourth consecutive Gulf South Conference championship — a conference record.

History
Since the rebirth of football at the University of North Alabama in 1949, UNA has been one of the most consistently successful programs in the state of Alabama and on a regional and national level.

As an NCAA Division II member, UNA was nationally ranked in the Top 25 of the final Division II poll 21 times from 1980 to 2017, with 15 Top Ten Rankings. UNA's 21 all-time playoff appearances are the second most in Division II history. In addition, UNA's 35 playoff wins are the second most in DII history and the Lions' 12 Gulf South Conference football crowns are by far the most in league history.

In 2018, the Lions began a new chapter with a transition to Division I and Football Championship Subdivision (FCS) status. The Lions played as an independent in the FCS in 2018 and finished with a 7-3 record. In 2019, UNA played its first season as a member of the Big South Conference and went 4-7 overall, losing three games by a touchdown or less. The Lions were not eligible to rank in the conference standings due to the transition but would have finished fourth with a 3-4 league mark. During the season, the Lions faced four nationally ranked FCS teams, all on the road.

The University of North Alabama fielded football teams from 1912 to 1928, but with little or no success.

Following a miserable showing in 1928, football was dropped at the University. For the next 21 years there were several efforts made to return football to the Florence campus by writing letters to the administration and gathering names on petitions. Those efforts finally proved successful on March 30, 1949, when President Dr. E.B. Norton held a student assembly to announce that football would return to campus that September.

Since that September day, the University has reaped 67 years worth of benefits from a football program that has helped put UNA on the map as one of the nation’s premier collegiate powers. As an example, North Alabama boasts the highest winningest percentage since 1990 of any collegiate football program from the football tradition rich state of Alabama at 72.29.

UNA's football success has come through the combined efforts of eight different head coaches, more than 80 assistant coaches and more than 1,200 student-athletes.

Since Hal Self guided the first Lion squad onto the field on Sept. 29, 1949, through UNA’s playoff loss that ended the 2009 season, the North Alabama program has made a name for itself like few others in the nation.

The 2008 season, UNA’s 60th since football returned to campus, was emblematic of the Lions’ current position in college football. The Lions posted a 12-2 record and came within one game of playing for the Division II National Championship on its home field. That’s because UNA had served as the host for the Division II Football Championship since 1986, and is the only school to have had the chance to claim a Division II title on its home field. Following a record-setting season of his own, North Alabama quarterback A.J. Milwee was the runner-up for the Division II National Player of the Year Award. That award is the Harlon Hill Trophy, named for the former Lion standout end whose name has been on the player of the year award since its creation in 1986.

Then in 2009, another historic chapter was written when nationally renowned coach Terry Bowden came to Florence and led the Lions to an 11-2 record, a Gulf South Conference championship, a spot in the quarterfinals of the Division II playoffs and a No. 6 national ranking in the final poll. It was UNA's fifth straight season with 10 or more wins and fifth straight playoff appearance. It was UNA's 15th overall playoff appearance and the Lions' 27 NCAA playoff wins are also the second most by any current Division II institution. North Alabama's Michael Johnson was named National Defensive Player of the Year by Daktronics and D2Football.com, lineman Montrell Craft was a national finalist for the Gene Upshaw Award as Division II's top lineman and quarterback Harrison Beck was a national finalist for the Harlon Hill Trophy as Division II Player of the Year.

In 2010 the Lions made their sixth consecutive NCAA playoff appearance and finished with a 9-4 record and followed that with a seventh straight post-season appearance in 2011.

In 2013 the Lions made their ninth post-season appearance in the last 11 years and reached the quarterfinals of the Division II playoffs and followed that with a 9-2 record and 19th NCAA post-season appearance in 2014 and a 9-3 record and 20th playoff trip in 2015. In 2016, North Alabama won an unprecedented fourth straight Gulf South Conference Championship, advanced to the Division II Playoffs for the 21st time and advanced to the Division II National Championship Game for the fifth time in school history.

But the Lions can trace their success much further back. The first 30 years after the rebirth of the Lion football program established a strong foundation for the program. Under the direction of Hal Self, the early Lion football teams were a model of consistency, enjoying 12 winning seasons in the first 14 years or the program. The Lions dominated other state institutions, going 12 years from 1952 to 1964 without losing a game to another school from Alabama (31-0-2). The Lions’ first conference title came in 1960 with the formation of the Alabama Collegiate Conference, and UNA would win four straight league titles. The first African American football players also joined the program during the Self era.

Upon Self’s retirement from coaching in 1969, Durell Mock became the first, and so far only, former Lion player to become the Lions’ head football coach. During Mock’s third and final season as head coach, the University became a charter member of the Gulf South Conference. Three years later Mickey Andrews came to Florence and stayed four years before giving way to Wayne Grubb as the school’s fourth head coach.

Grubb would lead UNA to 84 wins, three Gulf South Conference titles and its first three NCAA playoff appearances in an 11-year stint in Florence.

Following Grubb’s departure, UNA turned to Bobby Wallace to continue the Lion tradition and he was more than up for the challenge. In his 10 years in Florence, Wallace led UNA to 82 wins, three GSC titles, six playoff appearances and three NCAA Division II National Championships in 1993, 1994 and 1995.

North Alabama became the first school in the history of NCAA scholarship football to win three consecutive national championships, and UNA is still the only NCAA Division II institution to have won three straight crowns. Following that 1995 season, the Lions also became the first Division II squad invited to the White House, as the UNA squad met with President Bill Clinton, Vice President Al Gore and members of Congress.

From 1993-95 the Lions went 41-1 and set a Division II record by ranking No. 1 in the nation in 27 straight polls, UNA also tied a Division II record by winning 28 consecutive home games at Braly Stadium.

Wallace left UNA following another playoff run in 1997 and the Lions elevated longtime defensive coordinator Bill Hyde to the head coaching position. Hyde retired following the 2001 season and Mark Hudspeth became the seventh head coach in UNA history.

Hudspeth spent seven seasons in Florence and put the Lion program back at the top of Division II, winning 64 games and making five playoff appearances. Under Hudspeth’s direction, the Lions reached the NCAA semifinals three times, the quarterfinals twice, and had five seasons with 10 or more wins.

With six decades of success already on the books, even more excitement was brought to the Lion football program on December 31, 2008 with the hiring of Terry Bowden as UNA’s eighth head football coach.

Bringing a big-name, high profile former Division I National Coach of the Year to Florence sparked anticipation for year number 61 of Lion football and Bowden's first team didn't disappoint. UNA went 11-2 and won the Gulf South Conference championship. In three years in Florence Bowden compiled a 29-10 record with three NCAA playoff appearances.

Bobby Wallace returned to UNA prior to the 2012 season and led the Lions to a 5-5 record before his 2013 squad went 10-3, won a share of the GSC Championship and fought its way to the quarterfinals of the NCAA Division II Playoffs. Wallace and the Lions followed that with a 9-2 record, co-GSC Championship and another NCAA Playoff bid in 2014, a 9-3 record, third straight GSC title and NCAA Playoff appearance in 2015 and an unprecedented fourth straight GSC title, an 11-2 record and a trip to the Division II National Championship Game in 2016. Wallace retired at the conclusion of the season as the winningest coach in UNA history with a 126-51-1 record and as the winningest coach in Gulf South Conference history at 152-81-1.

After 15 seasons as an assistant coach on the UNA staff, Chris Willis became the Lions tenth head coach in 2017, leading the Lions in their final season of Division II competition as well as into the transition as an FCS program. Wilis led the Lions to a solid 7-3 finish in their first season in the FCS in 2018.

And of course with the team successes have come a remarkable amount of individual accolades. Since 1949, 63 different Lion players have earned first or second-team All-American honors. Wallace was selected as the Division II Coach of the Quarter Century and the 1995 UNA squad was chosen as Division II’s Best Team of the Quarter Century (1972-97).

Two Lion players, linebacker Ronald McKinnon (1995) and quarterback Will Hall (2003) won the Harlon Hill Trophy. Center Lance Ancar won the Division II Rimington Trophy as the division’s top center in 2005.

McKinnon and quarterback Cody Gross have been inducted into the Division II Football Hall of Fame and McKinnon received the ultimate honor when he was enshrined into the College Football Hall of Fame in 2008. Wallace was also inducted as part of the first class of coaches to enter the Division II Football Hall of Fame in 2010.

On a professional level, the Lions have produced an NFL Rookie of the Year and Most Valuable Player in Harlon Hill, and five other Lions have played on Super Bowl squads. A total of 24 Lions have been drafted by professional teams and 35 more have signed free agent NFL contracts. Numerous others have played in a variety of professional leagues in the United States, Canada and Europe.

Rivalries

West Alabama

UNA and the University of West Alabama (UWA) first played in 1949 and played every year through 2017. UNA leads the series 52–18–1. UWA won the first two meetings in 1949 (14–13) and 1950 (19–0), but UNA followed that with a thirteen-game winning streak (1951–1963). The longest winning streak in the series is held by UNA at fourteen games (1988–2001). The current winning streak is held by UWA at one game. The most recent match-up was played on September 23, 2017 resulting in a 38–17 victory for UWA. The 2017 meeting was likely the last for the foreseeable future since UNA has moved to the FCS.

Head coaches
 Records are through the end of the 2022 Season

Hal Self
Under the direction of head coach Hal Self, the college completed 1949 with a 4–5 record, turning in a slightly improved 5–4 record the following year. However, during Self's 21 seasons as head coach, the Lions compiled a 109–81–8 record, even posting wins against some Division I schools.

The Lions were especially dominant among other Alabama teams, building a 31–0–2 record, beginning with a 32–6 win over Livingston (now West Alabama) in 1952 and ending 12 years later with a 21–7 loss to Troy State in 1964. Self also amassed several Alabama Collegiate Conference championships and coached eight All-Americans, including Harlon Hill, the school’s first professional football star.

Former Lion standout Durell Mock succeeded Self in 1970, followed by Mickey Andrews in 1973.

Wayne Grubb
Wayne Grubb took over for Andrews in 1977. Grubb followed a disappointing 5–5 beginning season with 8 consecutive winning seasons, including Gulf South Conference championships in 1980, 1983, and 1985. UNA also qualified for the national semifinals in 1980 and 1983, competing for the Division II Championship at Palm Bowl in McAllen, Texas, in 1985.

In 1985, Florence's Braly Municipal Stadium also was secured as the site of the Division II national championship game, with UNA serving as the host institution until 2013, when it was announced that the championship would move to Kansas City, Missouri in 2014 and remain there through 2017. The Division II move to Florence also led to the adoption of the Harlon Hill Trophy, named after one of the most successful athletes in UNA's history.

Bobby Wallace (first stint)

The most successful era in UNA football history followed the hiring of Bobby Wallace as head football coach. Following a four-year rebuilding period, Wallace led the Lions to a 7–4–1 record in 1992 and competed in the second round of the Division II championship until losing to Jacksonville State, the eventual Division II national champions.

Over the next three years from 1993–95, UNA amassed a 41–1 record, which also encompassed three straight Gulf South Conference Championships and three consecutive NCAA Division II National Championships — the first three-peat in NCAA history. UNA also became the first program to achieve 40 wins in three seasons.

The only loss UNA suffered during this three-year period was to Youngstown State, a Division I-AA power at the time, losing narrowly, 17–14, following a field goal in the fourth quarter. Youngstown State went on to win the 1994 I-AA national championship.

During Wallace’s 10-year tenure, the UNA Lions competed in six NCAA playoffs and compiled an 82–36–1 record.

In 1995, UNA Lions were selected the “Best Team of the Quarter Century” in Division II, while Wallace was named Division II‘s “Coach of the Quarter Century.”

Following their third consecutive NCAA Division II Football Championship in 1995, the Lions were invited to the White House to meet President Bill Clinton, Vice President Al Gore, and members of Congress.

Mark Hudspeth

Following a 4-year interlude under Bill Hyde, Mark Hudspeth assumed the head coaching job at UNA in 2002. After a disappointing first year, Hudspeth led the Lions to another string of Division II playoff games.

In his first five seasons at UNA, Hudspeth posted the best record of any previous Lion head coach in their first five years – leading the Lions to a 44–17 mark, two Gulf South Conference titles, and three NCAA Division II playoff appearances. Hudspeth left UNA after the 2008 season to become an assistant under newly hired Mississippi State coach Dan Mullen.

Terry Bowden 
Former Auburn head coach Terry Bowden was named the new head coach on January 1, 2009. Bowden's brother, Jeff Bowden, also joined Terry at UNA as the WR coach. Pre-season hype focused on Bowden's remedy to a re-building roster by acquiring over twenty-five transfers from Division I schools including several from his father's Florida State team. The 2009 campaign would climax late in the season with an undefeated 10–0 record and the school's return to the #1 ranking for the first time since 1996. The season wrapped up with a UNA loss in the regional finals with an 11–2 record.

Bowden left after the 2011 season to take the head coaching job at Akron.

Bobby Wallace (second stint)
Wallace returned in 2012 for a second stint as head coach after Bowden's departure. Wallace led the Lions to four consecutive Gulf South Conference Championships and NCAA post-season appearances. Wallace ranks as the winningest football coach in Gulf South Conference history with 149 wins in his 19 years in the league. The 2012 season was a transition year for the Lions who finished fourth in the conference standings with a 5–5 overall record. After a successful off-season, the 2013 Lions had an impressive 10–3 record and shared the GSC title with in-state rival West Alabama. In 2014 Wallace led UNA to a 9–2 record that included winning a share of a second straight GSC Championship and a second straight berth in the Division II Playoffs. In 2015, coach Wallace led the Lions to a 9–3 record and shared their third consecutive GSC Championship with West Georgia and another Division II Playoff appearance. Wallace won his fourth consecutive GSC title outright in 2016 by going undefeated in conference play and received a fourth straight berth to the Division II Playoffs as the No. 1 seed in Region II. The Lions defeated UNC-Pembroke 41–17 in the second round, shutout North Greenville 38–0 in the quarterfinals, and went on to the semifinals winning at Shepherd 23–13, advancing to the national championship game. UNA fell to Northwest Missouri State 29–3 in the national championship and finished No. 2 in the final AFCA poll. Coach Wallace retired from UNA on December 20, 2016. Wallace finished his 15-year career at UNA with a 126–51–1 (.711) record, making him the winningest football coach in school history.

Chris Willis
Chris Willis was named head coach on December 22, 2016. Coach Willis has spent fifteen years on the UNA football staff and five years as defensive coordinator. Willis finished the 2017 season with a 5–5 record, avoiding the school's first losing season since 2002. The Lions finished tied for second in the GSC (with four other teams) and missed the playoffs for the first time since 2012. Because of NCAA transitional rules, the Lions will not be eligible for postseason until 2022 as a transitioning school to Division I. The Lions finished their first season in the FCS with a 7-3 record, and were 3-2 versus FCS opponents. The Lions fell to 4-7 during the 2019 campaign after playing a tough non-conference schedule featuring prominent FCS programs such as Montana and Jacksonville State. Big South Conference games did not count towards the standings due to transition rules; however, UNA finished with a 3-4 conference record.

Brent Dearmon
Brent Dearmon was hired as the head coach on December 3, 2022.

Yearly records

NCAA Division II playoff results
The Lions appeared in the NCAA Division II Football Championship playoffs 21 times, compiling an overall record of 35–18. They were national champions in 1993, 1994, and 1995.

Future non-conference opponents
Announced schedules as of December 18, 2022.

NFL Draft picks

Program achievements

References

External links
 

 
American football teams established in 1912
1912 establishments in Alabama